The 1985 NCAA Division III women's basketball tournament was the fourth annual tournament hosted by the NCAA to determine the national champion of Division III women's collegiate basketball in the United States.

Scranton defeated New Rochelle in the championship game, 68–59, to claim the Royals' first Division III national title.

The championship rounds were hosted in DePere, Wisconsin.

Bracket
First Round (round of 32)
 Muskingum 67, Frostburg St. 65
 Capital 85, Kean 64
 Allegheny 62, Buffalo St. 56
 New Rochelle 70, Rochester (NY) 66
 Stanislaus St. 59, Saint Mary’s (MN) 57
 Pomona-Pitzer 68, Concordia-M’head 59
 St. Norbert 72, Carroll (WI) 53
 Wis.-Whitewater 85, Alma 70
 Rust 83, Wooster 33
 UNC Greensboro 84, LeMoyne-Owen 77 (OT)
 Millikin 62, Simpson 60
 William Penn 75, Buena Vista 53
 Bridgewater St. 80, Rhode Island Col. 59
 Salem St. 78, Western Conn. St. 71
 Scranton 79, Gettysburg 57
 Pitt.-Johnstown 72, Susquehanna 62

Regional Final (round of sixteen)
 Muskingum 78, Capital 56
 New Rochelle 79, Allegheny 68
 Pomona-Pitzer 61, Stanislaus St. 47
 St. Norbert 82, Wis.-Whitewater 80 (OT)
 Rust 70, UNC Greensboro 66
 Millikin 67, William Penn 66
 Salem St. 63, Bridgewater St. 59
 Scranton 65, Pitt.-Johnstown 53

Elite Eight

All-tournament team
 Dawn Cillo, New Rochelle
 Lori Kerans, Millikin
 Deanna Kyle, Scranton
 Shelley Parks, Scranton
 Amy Proctor, St. Norbert

See also
 1985 NCAA Division I women's basketball tournament
 1985 NCAA Division II women's basketball tournament
 1985 NCAA Division III men's basketball tournament
 1985 NAIA women's basketball tournament

References

 
NCAA Division III women's basketball tournament
1985 in sports in Wisconsin